Mecyclothorax globicollis is a species of ground beetle in the subfamily Psydrinae. It was described by Mandl in 1969.

References

globicollis
Beetles described in 1969